Dumar-e Sofla (also Romanized as Dūmār-e Soflá; also known as Do Ghār-e Pā’īn, Dūmār, and Dūmār-e Pā’īn) is a village in Saghder Rural District, Jebalbarez District, Jiroft County, Kerman Province, Iran. At the 2006 census, its population was 10, in 7 families.

References 

Populated places in Jiroft County